Zainelabidine Saïdi ( (born Zainelabidine Ben Mohamed Saïdi, 26 June 1934) was a Tunisian educator, who marked generations of graduates of Sadiki College from 1964 to 1984.

References

External links
 Sadiki et les Sadikiens

Tunisian educators
1934 births
Living people
20th-century Tunisian people